Gravitation (also known as Gravity) is a mixed media work by the Dutch artist M. C. Escher completed in June 1952. It was first printed as a black-and-white lithograph and then coloured by hand in watercolour.

It depicts a nonconvex regular polyhedron known as the small stellated dodecahedron. Each facet of the figure has a trapezoidal doorway. Out of these doorways protrude the heads and legs of twelve turtles without shells, who are using the object as a common shell. The turtles are in six coloured pairs (red, orange, yellow, magenta, green and indigo) with each turtle directly opposite its counterpart.

See also
Printmaking

References

Further reading
Locher, J. L. (2000). The Magic of M. C. Escher. Harry N. Abrams, Inc. .

Works by M. C. Escher
1952 prints
Turtles in art